The 2016 WNBA season is the 9th season for the Atlanta Dream of the Women's National Basketball Association.  The regular season began May 14 and concluded September 18.  The Dream qualified for the playoffs as the sixth seed after missing the playoffs the previous year, finishing 17–17. The Dream defeated the Seattle Storm in the First Round of the Playoffs before falling to the Chicago Sky in the Second Round to end their season.

Transactions

WNBA Draft

Trades and Roster Changes

Roster
{| class="toccolours" style="font-size: 95%; width: 100%;"
|-
! colspan="2" style="background:#6495ED;color:white;"|2016 Atlanta Dream Roster
|- style="text-align:center; background-color:#FF0000; color:#FFFFFF;"
! Players !! Coaches
|-
| valign="top" |
{| class="sortable" style="background:transparent; margin:0px; width:100%;"
! Pos. !! # !! Nat. !! Name !! Ht. !! Wt. !! From
|-

Depth

Schedule

Preseason

|- bgcolor="ffcccc"
| 1
| May 4
| vs. San Antonio
| L 67–74
| Simmons (10)
| Williams (10)
| Tied (3)
| Mohegan Sun Arena4,199
| 0–1
|- bgcolor="ffcccc"
| 2
| May 5
| vs. Chicago
| L 75–95
| Williams (12)
| Hollivay (6)
| Holmes (8)
| Mohegan Sun Arena4,025
| 0–2
|- bgcolor="ffcccc"
| 3
| May 7
| @ Los Angeles
| L 80–88
| Holmes (18)
| Gray (8)
| Cortijo (6)
| Pasadena College460
| 0–3
|- bgcolor="ffcccc"
| 4
| May 10
| Los Angeles
| L 63–69
| Simmons (11)
| Williams (13)
| Ajavon (4)
| McCamish Pavilion1,385
| 0–4
|-

Regular season

|- style="background:#bbffbb;"
| 1
| May 14
| @ San Antonio
| W 73–63
| McCoughtry (15)
| Williams (10)
| Tied (3)
| AT&T Center7,572
| 1–0
|- style="background:#fcc;"
| 2
| May 20
| @ Indiana
| L 85–94
| Tied (19)
| McCoughtry (8)
| 3 Tied (2)
| Bankers Life Fieldhouse7,608
| 1–1
|- style="background:#bbffbb;"
| 3
| May 22
| Chicago
| W 87–81
| McCoughtry (21)
| Clarendon (8)
| Cortijo (5)
| Philips Arena6,152
| 2–1
|- style="background:#bbffbb;"
| 4
| May 24
| @ New York
| W 85–79 (OT)
| Hayes (27)
| Lyttle (14)
| Tied (3)
| Madison Square Garden14,503
| 3–1
|- style="background:#bbffbb;"
| 5
| May 27
| @ Dallas
| W 102–93
| McCoughtry (26)
| Lyttle (10)
| Lyttle (6)
| College Park Center4,712
| 4–1
|- style="background:#bbffbb;"
| 6
| May 29
| Indiana
| W 85–76
| McCoughtry (22)
| Williams (7)
| Hayes (6)
| Philips Arena5,233
| 5–1
|-

|- style="background:#bbffbb;"
| 7
| June 3
| @ Connecticut
| W 83–77
| Hayes (23)
| Lyttle (11)
| McCoughtry (4)
| Mohegan Sun Arena4,541
| 6–1
|- style="background:#fcc;"
| 8
| June 5
| Washington
| L 79–86
| McCoughtry (28)
| Lyttle (11)
| Cortijo (5)
| Philips Arena3,611
| 6–2
|- style="background:#fcc;"
| 9
| June 10
| Minnesota
| L 78–110
| Hayes (23)
| Clarendon (7)
| McCoughtry (4)
| Philips Arena5,368
| 6–3
|- style="background:#bbffbb;"
| 10
| June 12
| Connecticut
| W 93–87
| Williams (20)
| Williams (10)
| Clarendon (9)
| Philips Arena4,486
| 7–3
|- style="background:#bbffbb;"
| 11
| June 17
| Chicago
| W 101–97
| McCoughtry (22)
| Williams (9)
| Hayes (5)
| Philips Arena4,560
| 8–3
|- style="background:#fcc;"
| 12
| June 18
| @ Washington
| L 65–95
| Hayes (12)
| McCoughtry (8)
| Cortijo (4)
| Verizon Center6,977
| 8–4
|- style="background:#fcc;"
| 13
| June 22
| New York
| L 79–90
| McCoughtry (22)
| Lyttle (11)
| Tied (4)
| Philips Arena10,345
| 8–5
|- style="background:#fcc;"
| 14
| June 25
| @ San Antonio
| L 69–73
| McCoughtry (23)
| Williams (10)
| Tied (3)
| AT&T Center9,439
| 8–6
|- style="background:#fcc;"
| 15
| June 28
| @ Seattle
| L 81–84
| McCoughtry (22)
| Hollivay (9)
| Tied (3)
| KeyArena4,648
| 8–7
|- style="background:#fcc;"
| 16
| June 30
| @ Los Angeles
| L 75–84
| Hayes (32)
| Williams (10)
| Clarendon (7)
| Staples Center10,215
| 8–8
|-

|- style="background:#fcc;"
| 17
| July 3
| Phoenix
| L 87–95
| Hayes (26)
| Williams (9)
| Hayes (5)
| Philips Arena6,557
| 8–9
|- style="background:#bbffbb;"
| 18
| July 5
| Seattle
| W 77–64
| Lyttle (22)
| Lyttle (11)
| Tied (4)
| Philips Arena3,983
| 9–9
|- style="background:#bbffbb;"
| 19
| July 8
| Dallas
| W 95–90 (OT)
| Tied (27)
| Lyttle (14)
| McCoughtry (9)
| Philips Arena6,745
| 10–9
|- style="background:#bbffbb;"
| 20
| July 10
| @ Connecticut
| W 67–63
| McCoughtry (26)
| Lyttle (14)
| Lyttle (3)
| Mohegan Sun Arena5,857
| 11–9
|- style="background:#fcc;"
| 21
| July 13
| @ New York
| L 86–62
| Hayes (12)
| Lyttle (9)
| Clarendon (3)
| Madison Square Garden11,317
| 11–10
|- style="background:#fcc;"
| 22
| July 15
| @ Indiana
| L 72–78
| Cortijo (20)
| Williams (8)
| McCoughtry (6)
| Bankers Life Fieldhouse8,612
| 11–11
|- style="background:#bbffbb;"
| 23
| July 17
| Los Angeles
| W 91–74
| Tied (17)
| Williams (12)
| Clarendon (6)
| Philips Arena7,551
| 12–11
|- style="background:#fcc;"
| 24
| July 20
| @ Minnesota
| L 65–83
| Clarendon (11)
| Williams (8)
| Tied (2)
| Target Center16,132
| 12–12
|- style="background:#bbffbb;"
| 25
| July 22
| Dallas
| W 93–88
| Gray (22)
| Williams (11)
| McCoughtry (5)
| McCamish Pavilion4,749
| 13–12
|-

|- style="background:#fcc;"
| 26
| August 26
| @ Chicago
| L 82–90
| Tied (19)
| Williams (9)
| Tied (4)
| Allstate Arena6,016
| 13–13
|- style="background:#bbffbb;"
| 27
| August 28
| Connecticut
| W 87–73
| McCoughtry (22)
| Williams (8)
| 3 Tied (5)
| Philips Arena7,055
| 14–13
|-

|- style="background:#fcc;"
| 28
| September 4
| Seattle
| L 82–91
| McCoughtry (32)
| Williams (6)
| Williams (4)
| Philips Arena5,695
| 14–14
|- style="background:#bbffbb;"
| 29
| September 6
| Phoenix
| W 91–87
| McCoughtry (27)
| McCoughtry (8)
| Clarendon (6)
| Philips Arena3,625
| 15–14
|- style="background:#bbffbb;"
| 30
| September 8
| @ Los Angeles
| W 86–81
| McCoughtry (32)
| Williams (12)
| Clarendon (6)
| Staples Center6,152
| 16–14
|- style="background:#fcc;"
| 31
| September 11
| @ Phoenix
| L 75–86
| Hayes (22)
| Williams (16)
| Clarendon (4)
| Talking Stick Resort Arena9,877
| 16–15
|- style="background:#fcc;"
| 32
| September 13
| San Antonio
| L 67–71
| Holmes (20)
| Williams (12)
| Hayes (4)
| Philips Arena5,312
| 16–16
|- style="background:#bbffbb;"
| 33
| September 15
| Washington
| W 94–91
| McCoughtry (31)
| Williams (10)
| Clarendon (9)
| Philips Arena4,404
| 17–16
|- style="background:#fcc;"
| 34
| September 17
| @ Minnesota
| L 87–95
| McCoughtry (18)
| Williams (9)
| Clarendon (7)
| Target Center11,663
| 17–17

Playoffs

|- style="background:#bbffbb;"
| 1
| September 21
| Seattle
| W 94–85
| McCoughtry (37)
| Williams (16)
| Tied (7)
| McCamish Pavilion2,553
| 1–0
|- style="background:#fcc;"
| 2
| September 25
| @ Chicago
| L 98–108
| Hayes (30)
| Williams (9)
| McCoughtry (9)
| Allstate Arena3,922
| 0–1

Standings

Playoffs

Statistics

Regular Season

Playoffs

Awards and Honors

References

External links
THE OFFICIAL SITE OF THE ATLANTA DREAM
Atlanta Dream 2016 Schedule - Dream Home and Away - ESPN

Atlanta Dream seasons
Atlanta
Atlanta Dream